Trenton Gill (born January 1, 1999) is an American football punter for the Chicago Bears of the National Football League (NFL). He played college football at NC State.

Early life and high school
Gill grew up in Hillsborough, North Carolina and attended Cedar Ridge High School, where he played soccer and tennis in addition to kicking and punting on the football team.

College career
Gill was a member of the NC State Wolfpack for five seasons. He redshirted his true freshman season and was the backup to A. J. Cole III as a redshirt freshman. Gill took over as the Wolfpack's punter as a redshirt sophomore and set a school record with 47.6 yards per punt on 56 punts and was named third-team All-Atlantic Coast Conference (ACC). He was named first-team All-ACC as a redshirt senior.

Professional career
Gill was selected with the 255th overall pick in the seventh round of the 2022 NFL Draft by the Chicago Bears.

On September 11, 2022, in a game against the San Francisco 49ers, Gill was penalized for using a towel to wipe off the field.

References

External links

Chicago Bears bio
NC State Wolfpack bio

1999 births
Living people
NC State Wolfpack football players
People from Hillsborough, North Carolina
Players of American football from North Carolina
Chicago Bears players
American football punters